Vermin are animal species regarded as pests.

Vermin may also refer to:

Entertainment
Vermin (album), a 2005 album by Old Man's Child
Vermin (comics), a Marvel Comics supervillain
Vermin (video game), a 1980 Nintendo Game & Watch game
The Vermin, an American punk band

Politics
Vermin Club, a British Conservative Party grassroots organisation of the 1940s
Operation Vermin, a 1952 East German Stasi operation

People
Vermin Supreme (born 1961), American performance artist, anarchist, and activist
Joël Vermin (born 1992), Swiss ice hockey player

See also